Hamilton Central or Central Hamilton may refer to:

Canada
 Hamilton Centre, a federal electoral district
 Hamilton Centre (provincial electoral district), a provincial electoral district of Ontario

New Zealand
 Hamilton Central, the business district of the city of Hamilton

Scotland
 Hamilton Central railway station, a railway station in Hamilton, South Lanarkshire

See also
 Hamilton East (disambiguation)
 Hamilton North (disambiguation)
 Hamilton South (disambiguation)
 Hamilton West (disambiguation)